Optim Sports Medicine Field is a 5,300-seat soccer-specific stadium in Statesboro, Georgia. The stadium is the home field for South Georgia Tormenta FC, a professional soccer club that plays in USL League One, the third tier of soccer in the United States.

History
The stadium opened on October 2, 2022 with a 1–1 tie versus the Richmond Kickers. Tormenta's Fuad Adeniyi scored the opening goal in the 41st minute.

References 

Buildings and structures in Bulloch County, Georgia
USL League One stadiums